Michael Steven Duursma (born 26 February 1978, Heiloo) is a Dutch professional baseball player who currently plays for Pioniers and the Dutch national team.

He is the brother of Mark Duursma and was one of the few Dutch players to play in NCAA Division I.

Career 

Duursma hit .343/.414 in 1999 as a sophomore for Cypress Community College; he had started at shortstop and as a freshman as well. Also in 1999, Duursma played for the Dutch team in the European Championship and was rated the best defensive player. He also was with HCAW in the Hoofdklasse and went 5 for 9 with 2 runs, 2 RBI, 2 doubles and a steal in a valiant effort in a losing cause in the 1999 Holland Series.

In 2000, he transferred to Purdue University. As a junior, he fielded .942 and hit .267/.367/.331. He was hit by a pitch 13 times, which at the time ranked second in school history behind Sean Helsel.He played for the Dutch team in the preliminary games for the 2000 Summer Olympics, but was not selected for the final squad that represented the nation in Sydney.

In his senior year, he started every game for Purdue at shortstop, usually hitting 9th. He fielded .938 and was called by the Purdue website arguably the best defensive shortstop in the Big Ten. He batted .298/.378/.416 and went 3 for 7 in the Big Ten Conference tournament. He made the All-Conference team as the top shortstop. Overall, he had hit .283/.351/.374 with Purdue.

Undrafted in the 2001 amateur draft, Duursma returned to the Netherlands with the Minolta Pioniers. He hit .340 in 2002 but did not qualify for the batting championship; he would have tied Percy Isenia for 4th in Hoofdklasse. He did tie for sixth with two triples. Duursma replaced Ralph Milliard on the Dutch national team for the 2003 World Port Tournament but saw limited action, going 0 for 2 with 3 runs, presumably used as a pinch-runner. He also was on the European Cup winners with Pioniers. In the Hoofdklasse he led in runs (43, 6 more than runner-up Milliard) and tied for 9th with 10 steals.

Duursma hit .328 in 2004, fifth in Hoofdklasse. He again led in runs (39, four more than René Cremer) and tied Johnny Balentina for sixth in hits (45) and led in steals (20 in 21 tries, two more SB than Milliard). He also went 0 for 4 against Japan in the 2004 Haarlem Baseball Week. He failed to make the final cut for the 2004 Summer Olympics as the Dutch team went with Evert-Jan 't Hoen, Milliard and Reily Legito on the middle infield.

In 2005, Duursma batted .307/.439/.346 and fielded .964. He was 10th in Hoofdklasse in average, fifth with 47 hits (one behind brother Mark), 6th with 24 RBI and tied for 7th with 9 steals. He led the 2005 European Championship with 14 walks in 10 contests; no one else had more than 9. He also played error-free ball at second base. In the 2005 Baseball World Cup, Duursma hit .302/.412/.395 with 12 runs in 11 games. During the 2006 World Baseball Classic, Duursma had the best average on the Dutch team, though he played in just one game. He went 2 for 4 with two strikeouts in the contest against Panama.

Duursma slipped a bit in 2006, hitting .274/.433/.306 with 12 steals in 13 tries and a .952 fielding percentage. He was still second in Hoofdklasse in runs, with 38, only two behind leader Balentina. He was 4th in the circuit in stolen bases. He led the league with 11 times hit by pitch and his 33 walks tied brother Mark for the lead.In the 2006 Holland Series, he hit .278/.409/.333 in a losing cause, leading the Series with two steals.

He was 4 for 15 with 4 walks and 3 runs in the 2006 Haarlem Baseball Week as the Netherlands took the title. In the 2006 Intercontinental Cup, Duursma batted .323/.432/.323. In the gold medal game, with the Netherlands down 3–2 in the bottom of the 10th, Duursma singled off of Frank Montieth, then scored on a double by Dirk van 't Klooster. The Dutch team got no closer but still won the silver medal.

Duursma batted .319/.440/.333 in 2007 Hoofdklasse, scoring 37 runs in 38 games. He tied for 10th in the league in OBP, was 4th in runs and tied for fifth with 25 walks. He hit .231/.286/.231 in the 2007 Holland Series; his 3 hits came in game one, in which he also had a crucial run-costing error. The Pioniers lost the Series to Kinheim. Duursma hit .143/.208/.286 and made two errors as the worst Dutch starting position player in the 2007 European Baseball Championship. The team still won the Gold and qualified the 2008 Summer Olympics. He was 3 for 16 with 4 walks in the 2007 World Port Tournament. Duursma struggled again in the 2007 Baseball World Cup, going 1 for 7 with a run and an error in three games as Roel Koolen took over as the main second baseman.

Duursma played for Dutch national team at the 2008 Haarlem Baseball Week and batted .200 and led the team with 5 walks.
Duursma was selected by coach Robert Eenhoorn in the team that represents the Netherlands at the 2008 Summer Olympics in Beijing.
During the 2008 season he batted .279 in Hoofdklasse and scored 34 runs in 38 games for Pioniers.

In 2009, Duursma played for the Dutch national team which went on to upset the Dominican Republic at the 2009 World Baseball Classic. Duursma batted .260 in Hoofdklasse and scored 31 runs in 33 games while playing shortstop for Pioniers. At the 2009 World Port Tournament he played shortstop and second base and led the tournament with 10 walks in 8 games.

Duursma struggled in 2010 when he batted .203/.309/.258 but had a .957 fielding percentage for Pioniers in de Hoofdklasse. Playing at the 2010 Haarlem Baseball Week he batted .294 as the Dutch national team took the title. In Germany, At the 2010 European Baseball Championship he batted .273 with a home run while playing shortstop and second base. The Dutch lost the final against Italy.

In 2011, Duursma batted .301/.451/.368 in the Hoofdklasse. His .451 OBP was 3rd in the league and his 32 walks was tied for 3rd in the league. He ended up scoring 33 runs in 39 games for Pioniers. Shortstop, Duursma, had a .963 fielding percentage. Pioniers went on to win the play-offs as Duursma went 12 for 29 for a .414 average and had a .528 OBP before struggling in the Holland Series as Pioniers lost to Amsterdam. Duursma was selected by coach Brian Farley for the 2011 World Port Tournament and started at shortstop all 8 games while batting .261 for the Dutch.

In 2012, Duursma batted .333/.465/.389 in 2012 while playing for Pioniers in Hoofdklasse.  His .333 average was tied for 9th in the league, while his .465 on-base percentage was 3rd highest.  He scored 30 runs and had 28 runs batted in and had a .963 fielding percentage at shortstop. His 10 sac bunts led Hoofdklasse. During the 2012 Haarlem Baseball Week he started all 7 games at shortstop for the Dutch national team. He led the tournament with a .429 average, going 9 for 21 and a tournament high .600 OBP. At the 2012 European Baseball Championship Duursma played third base as Italy went on to beat the Netherlands in the final.

References

External links
Duursma's profile at honkbalsite.com 

1978 births
Living people
2009 World Baseball Classic players
2006 World Baseball Classic players
Baseball players at the 2008 Summer Olympics
Cypress Chargers baseball players
Dutch expatriate baseball players in the United States
Olympic baseball players of the Netherlands
Purdue Boilermakers baseball players
People from Heiloo
Konica Minolta Pioniers players
Vaessen Pioniers players
L&D Amsterdam Pirates players
Sportspeople from North Holland